Diane Hegarty July 10, 1942 – July 23, 2022), was an American religious leader who, along with longtime partner Anton LaVey, co-founded the Church of Satan.

Biography
Hegarty, also known as Diane LaVey and Diana Hall, was born July 10, 1942. As well as being a self-described sorceress, Diane was co-founder with Anton LaVey of the Church of Satan and served as High Priestess for approximately 25 years.

Anton LaVey divorced his first wife Carole and began a relationship with Hegarty that lasted  24 years, from 1960 to 1984. They had a child, Zeena Schreck (née LaVey). At the end of their relationship Diane Hegarty sued for palimony. She appears in many of the filmed rituals of the Church. These have become stock footage for anyone desiring a depiction of Satanism. Along with her Satanic duties as hostess, model enchantress, mother and magician's wife, she helped Anton raise a lion cub named Togare.

Hegarty administered the Church and typed and edited The Satanic Bible, The Satanic Rituals, The Compleat Witch (aka The Satanic Witch) and The Devil’s Notebook. She did most of the Church's administrative, press and member relations work. Their daughter Zeena Schreck was in the media spotlight at age 3, at her Satanic baptism, and again defending the Church of Satan against allegations of Satanic ritual abuse as public representative and High Priestess of the Church of Satan between 1985 and 1990 during the 1980s Satanic panic, the politically-motivated Christian fundamentalist witch-hunts in America. Daughter Schreck resigned from the Church of Satan and renounced LaVeyan Satanism to pursue her own spiritual path in 1990 and ceased all contact with her family.

Later in life Hegarty dedicated herself to helping her grandson Stanton LaVey's career. Her death preceded the death of Stanton LaVey (d. December 19, 2022) by five months. Hegarty-Hall also worked as a graphology specialist.

References

External links
The Devilish Duo  Photo

1942 births
2022 deaths
American LaVeyan Satanists
Church of Satan
Female religious leaders
Satanist religious leaders
Graphologists
Writers from Chicago